Karbigwan is a town located in the Kanpur district of Uttar Pradesh, India, about  south of Kanpur, the district's largest village.

Police station- Narwal
Tehsil-Narwal

Cities and towns in Kanpur Nagar district